was a Japanese polymath and rōnin of the Edo period. Gennai was a pharmacologist, student of Rangaku, physician, author, painter and inventor well known for his Erekiteru (electrostatic generator), Kandankei (thermometer), and Kakanpu (asbestos cloth). Gennai also composed several works on (homosexual) life and desire in Japan, such as the Nenashigusa (1763), the Kiku no en (1764), the San no asa (1768), and the Nenashigusa kohen (1768). He also wrote a few satirical essays, including  "On Farting" Rootless Grass, and A Lousy Journey of Love. He is best known by the name of Hiraga Gennai.

Biography

Family history 
Hiraga Gennai was born in 1729 in the village of Shidoura, Sanuki Province (part of the modern city of Sanuki, Kagawa. He was the third son of Shiraishi Mozaemon (Yoshifusa) a ashigaru low-level provincial samurai in the service of the Takamatsu Domain. The Shiraishi clan traced their roots to Saku District in Shinano Province where they were local warlords with the surname of "Hiraga". However, after they were defeated by the Takeda clan, they fled to Mutsu Province and entered the service of the Date clan, taking the new surname of "Shiraishi" from a location in Mutsu. They accompanied a cadet branch of the Date clan to Uwajima Domain in Shikoku, but eventually moved to Takamatsu where they supplemented their meagre income as a low-ranking samurai with farming. Gennai studied Confucianism and haiku poetry, and crafted kakejiku as a child in Takamatsu.

Early life
In 1741, Gennai began his studies as an herbalist and became an apprentice to a physician at the age of 12. Later at the age of 18 Gennai was offered an official position in the herb garden of the local . In 1748, his father died, and he became head of the family.

Midlife

Life in Nagasaki
Gennai visited Nagasaki around 1752, where he studied oil painting, western medicine. The western medicine Gennai studied included European pharmaceutical and surgical techniques and other rangaku topics. Soon after his return from Nagasaki, he turned the role of head of household over to his sister and abandoned his family. Nagasaki was at the time one of the only ports that foreign ships were allowed to enter and therefore the Dutch East Indies Company (VOC) along with a host of Chinese traders resided in the port town, and there were able to do business under highly regulated supervision. The interaction that Gennai had with the Chinese merchants and members of the VOC introduced him to ceramics. The following year Gennai relocated to Osaka and Kyoto, where he studied medicinal herbs under Toda Kyokuzan before moving to Edo in 1757.

Life in Edo
In Edo, he studied with Tamura Ransui, and with his oversight and support Gennai began to cultivate natural specimens of ginseng. This made the transition from imports of the medicinal herb to domestic production possible. While in Edo Gennai wrote a number of books, some on scientific or nature topics, some satirical novels, in the kokkeibon and dangibon genres. Gennai was an onna-girai and composed several works on the subject, including guidebooks on the male prostitutes of his days and works of fiction exalting sex between men over heterosexuality.In his scientific experiments, Gennai prospected for various minerals, wove asbestos, calculated temperatures, and worked with static electricity. He returned to Nagasaki to study mining and the techniques of refining ores.

Mining
In 1761, he discovered iron deposits in Izu Province and worked as a broker to establish a mining venture. He also held exhibitions of his various inventions in Edo, and came to be known to Tanuma Okitsugu, a senior official in the Tokugawa shogunate, as well as the doctors Sugita Genpaku and Nakagawa Jun'an.  In 1766, he assisted Kawagoe Domain to develop an asbestos mine in what is now part of Chichibu, Saitama. While these, he also studied techniques to improve the efficiency of charcoal furnaces and the construction of river boats. In 1772 Gennai was on a trip to Nagasaki and uncovered a store of clay this led to him petitioning the government to allow him to manufacture pottery on a large scale, for both exports and  domestic use. 

"If the Japanese ware is good, then naturally we will not spend our gold and silver on the foreign commodity. Rather to the contrary: since both the Chinese and Hollanders will come to seek out these wares and carry them home, this will be of everlasting national benefit. Since it is originally clay, no matter how much pottery we send out, there need be no anxiety about a depletion of resources". Also in 1773, he was invited by Satake Yoshiatsu to Kubota Domain to teach mining engineering, and while in Dewa Province, also gave lessons in western oil painting.

Pottery
Gennai made or instructed a number of Japanese pottery pieces which are named Gennai ware after him. The style is unique with brilliant colours, mostly three, following the Kōchi ware style from Gennai's native island of Shikoku.

End of life
Gennai was back in Edo by the summer of 1779, where he undertook repairs to a Daimyō mansion. His final days are surrounded in mystery. The most prevalent account is that he was arrested in late 1779 for killing two carpenters on the project in a drunken rage after they had accused him of stealing the plans for the mansion. He subsequently died in prison on January 24 of then following year of tetanus. Sugita Genpaku wanted to hold a funeral service, but this was denied for unknown reasons by the Shogunate, so Sugita held a memorial service with no body and with no tombstone. This has given rise to many theories over the years that Gennai had not actually died in prison, but had been spirited away, possibly by the intervention of Tanuma Okitsugu, and lived out the rest of his life somewhere in obscurity.

Grave of Hiraga Gennai

Despite the original prohibition on his funeral, Hiraga Gennai had a grave at the temple of Sosen-ji in Asakusabashi (currently Hashiba, Taitō-ku, Tokyo) . In 1928, following the 1923 Great Kantō earthquake, the temple was relocated to Itabashi, but its cemetery remained behind. Behind his grave is the grave of Fukusuke, his long-time manservant, and next to the tombstone is a stone monument with an epitaph by Sugita Genpaku, his life-long friend. The tomb was reconstructed by  Count Yorinaga Matsudaira in 1931. It received protection as a National Historic Site in 1943. The site is a 12-minute walk from Minami-Senju Station on the Hibiya Line; however, the grave is not open to the public.

In addition, Hiraga has a second grave at the Hiraga family bodaiji in Sanuki, Kagawa.

Works

On Farting
Gennai published many works over the course of his literary career. The most well known being On Farting, a satirical work which aimed at exploring the themes between high and low Ryōgoku.
Within this work Gennai himself is depicted as having a "spirited" debate with a samurai, over a peasant that had become a popular entertainer called a fart-ist. The fart-ist would entertain crowds with their manipulation of flatulence. Gennai compares the fart-ist in the same category as weightlifters and fire eaters of the Ryōgoku district. Within the piece Gennai and his friends debate if a drug is being used by the artist that allows the performance to be possible. Gennai makes the argument that the feat is impressive and commendably unique. Another character, a Confucian Samurai Ishibe Kinkichiro argues that the rudeness of the act and the stupidity of viewers goes against the rules of Confucian manners by encouraging something like this to be performed in public. Gennai in the dialogue with Kinkichiro compares conflicting values against one another. For the Confucian samurai the performance in a serious offence against conception of propriety and social order. Where as Gennai believes that it embodies wisdom and creativity, but the two agree that a fart is nothing more than a useless discharge and that is cannot compare to the officially sanctioned work which is labeled as productive. It could not compare to the mental work that comes with running Tokugawa society. However the two do disagree on what this discharge means and its implications. For Kinkichiro it goes against everything that the "true sages" taught society about human decency and etiquette. For Gennai the creativity and the discharge being nothing more that a feat of wisdom by the fart-ist, because he was able to make useless excess into music. By presenting it this way Gennai exposed a problem with the categorization of material and media as either high or low. As the story continues Gennai continues to target high culture and its custodians and its mode or preproduction.

Rootless Grass

Another of Gennai's note-able satirical works is the is Rootless Grass. A story of Enma, who falls in love with a Onnagata. In Gennai's description of hell, it is a lively place, but is currently in the midst of a large construction project. This project is due to the need for more space, in large part because of the massive growth in population that hell is enduring. King Enma tasks the Dragon King with the retrieval of the Onnagata Kinkunojo II which has become the object of Enma's affection. The Dragon King holds court to determine who will go to the mortal world to retrieve the Onnagata. However there is an issue is trying to figure out which retainer would be the best to send. In the end the Dragon king sends the gatekeeper a Kappa to complete this task. The Kappa tries seduce the actor and then attempts to drown them, in order to complete their task. In the end the Kappa ends up falling for the young actor and instead brings back a less attractive Onnagata as a consolation prize. This caused Enma to venture out to the mortal realm in search of Kinkunojo. This unfortunately caused in interaction with a hero, which leads to Enma being defeated.

A Lousy Journey of Love 
Continuing the theme of satirical publications, Gennai's piece A Lousy Journey of Love is a part of his posthumous complication of short stories, Blown Blossom and Fallen Leaves. Within this piece, the reader follows the journey of two lice that are traversing the body of a boy. There are frequent plays on words within this piece which adds to the effect of exaggerating the absurdity and humor of the point of view of a louse.

Appearances in fiction
Gennai appears as a scholar/inventor and cross-dressing lesbian in the manga Ōoku: The Inner Chambers (2005–2020) by Fumi Yoshinaga.
In the anime OVA: Mask of Zeguy Hiraga Gennai had a prominent role (along with Hijikata Toshizo) in protecting Miki (who is a descendant of the renowned Priestess Shamus) and preventing the legendary mask from falling into the wrong hands.
In the anime OVA: T.P. Sakura, Hiraga Gennai appears in addition to his elekiter.
In the anime Oh! Edo Rocket episode 10 it is revealed that the retired resident is Gennai. The Fūrai Row-House Block, which he says is his, is also likely a nod to one of his pen names.
In the anime Gintama, there is a mechanic known as Hiraga Gengai.
The anime Zero no Tsukaima has a character by the name of Hiraga Saito. Since Saito hails from Japan, it is speculated that he is named after Gennai.
Gennai makes an appearance in the anime Read or Die, along with the clones of many other historical and legendary figures. In Read Or Die, Gennai uses his elekiter as a very high powered destructive weapon that he uses to destroy the White House and eradicate an entire fleet of combat helicopters. 
A giant mechanical frog is named after him in Mai-HiME.
In the anime Flint the Time Detective, he makes an appearance with the Time Shifter Elecky as he uses it to make giant robots.
In the Square game Live-A-Live, there is a mechanic named Gennai who is responsible for the creation of mechanical traps in the Bakumatsu Chapter.  Since the setting of the chapter is the Bakumatsu era, his presence is an anachronism, but considering the additional presence of Ishikawa Goemon, Yodo-Dono, and Shiro Tokisada Amakusa, it is clear that this section of the game was intentionally designed as a mash-up of popular Japanese history.
In the 36th episode of Kikaida 01 Hiraga Gennai is threatened by time traveling robots from 1974 disguised as ninja. The evil Shadow tends to take him to 1974 and have him help build better robots.
In the 30th episode of Demashita! Powerpuff Girls Z (ガールズとカレ!, "Girls and Him!"), a character by the name of Hiraga Kennai is responsible for the creation of a primitive form of Chemical Z and the Ōedo Chakichaki Musume. He also uses an elekiter to separate Him's soul (the black light) from his body.
In the 13th episode of the first season of the anime Digimon Adventure (エンジェモン覚醒!, "Angemon's Awakening!"), an elderly man named Gennai appears to the Chosen Children/Digidestined and helps them with their journey. He reappears in the second season called Digimon Adventure 02 as a younger man. His Digimon Adventure design appears to be based on old-fashioned Japanese styles, and both it and his name were likely inspired by the historical Gennai.
In the light novel Hidan no Aria, Gennai is the famous ancestor of the Amdo Butei Aya Hiraga.
In the 6th episode of the anime Sengoku Collection he is embodied in a genius and clumsy girl.
In the anime Carried by the Wind: Tsukikage Ran, Gennai makes an appearance in episode 7.
In the manga Korokoro Soushi, by Shintaro Kago, as a recurrent character.
Takashi Yamaguchi played Hiraga Gennai in Tenkagomen, an NHK drama series (1971–1972).
In a mobile card turn-based video game Valkyrie Crusade, a female version of Hiraga exists as a card. Elekiter also mentioned with "her".
In the free-to-play MMORPG Onigiri, there is a female version of Hiraga Gennai. She is part of the main quest line story. As a special partner character, players can also control her using the 'Vanguard Swap' feature.
In the web series Critical Role, in the Call of Cthulhu RPG one-shot, Gennai is a member of a secret society that wishes to cast light in every corner of the world, in order to starve The Village of the Hungry Night. Dr. Ida Codswell uses Gennai's elekiter to momentarily turn on the lights of The Crystal Palace to keep off The Village of the Hungry Night.
In the season 3, episode 9 of Star Trek: Discovery Terra Firma 1, a starship named USS Hiraga Gennai is mentioned as answering a distress call.

References

Further reading

External links 

1729 births
1779 deaths
18th-century essayists
18th-century Japanese physicians
18th-century LGBT people
Gay scientists
Japanese LGBT scientists
Japanese gay writers
Japanese essayists
Japanese inventors
Japanese people convicted of murder
Japanese people who died in prison custody
Japanese scientists
Japanese writers of the Edo period
People convicted of murder by Japan
Prisoners who died in Japanese detention
History of art in Japan
Deaths from tetanus